Oliver Schnitzler (born 13 October 1995) is a German footballer who plays as a goalkeeper for SV Rahrbachtal.

References

External links
 

Living people
1995 births
German footballers
Germany youth international footballers
People from Gummersbach
Sportspeople from Cologne (region)
Footballers from North Rhine-Westphalia
Association football goalkeepers
VfR Aalen players
1. FC Heidenheim players
SC Preußen Münster players
SG Sonnenhof Großaspach players
2. Bundesliga players
3. Liga players
Regionalliga players